Garland is an unincorporated community in Bourbon County, Kansas, United States. As of the 2020 census, the population of the community and nearby areas was 31.

History
Garland was originally called Memphis. The name was changed to Garland (after a brand of stoves) when the railroad came through in the 1880s.

Geography

Demographics

For statistical purposes, the United States Census Bureau has defined Garland as a census-designated place (CDP).

Education
The community is served by Fort Scott USD 234 public school district.

References

Further reading

External links
 Bourbon County maps: Current, Historic - KDOT

Unincorporated communities in Bourbon County, Kansas
Unincorporated communities in Kansas